Astragalus whitneyi is a species of legume known by the common name balloon-pod milk-vetch, balloon milk-vetch, or Whitney's locoweed.  It is a native to the Cascade Range and the Sierra Nevada (U.S.) and is unusual for its bright red or red-splotched balloon-like seedpods.

Varieties include:
 Astragalus whitneyi var. confusus
 Astragalus whitneyi var. siskiyouensis
 Astragalus whitneyi var. whitneyi

References

External links
WTU Herbarium Image Collection

whitneyi
Flora of Washington (state)